Abagrotis alternata, the greater red dart or mottled gray cutworm, is a moth of the family Noctuidae. The species was first described by Augustus Radcliffe Grote in 1865. It is found in eastern North America, from New Brunswick west across southern Canada to western Alberta, south to Arizona, New Mexico and the Gulf of Mexico.

The wingspan is 38–43 mm. Adults are on wing in August in Alberta. There is one generation per year.

The larvae feed on a wide range of plants. In eastern North America they can become pests on vegetable crops and in some fruit trees, damaging buds and new growth. Recorded food plants include white spruce, walnut, hickories, oak, strawberry, apple, cherry, plum, peach, potato and tomato.

Abagrotis alternata does not have a significant economic impact despite its prevalence in the northern United States.

References

External links

"Abagrotis alternata (Grote 1864)". Moths of North Dakota. Archived November 22, 2008.

alternata
Moths of North America
Moths described in 1865